Chris Clarke is a Canadian retired soccer player.  He played professionally in the USL A-League and National Professional Soccer League.

Clarke played youth soccer with Metro-Ford.  In 1996, he signed with the Vancouver 86ers in the A-League.  He played for Vancouver until released during the 1999 season.  In April 2000, Clarke rejoined Vancouver.  In the fall of 1996, Clarke joined the Edmonton Drillers of the National Professional Soccer League, playing four seasons with them.  In 2000, he moved to the Buffalo Blizzard for one season.  In 2003, Clarke briefly returned to professional soccer with the Calgary Storm.

References

Living people
1978 births
A-League (1995–2004) players
Buffalo Blizzard players
Calgary Storm players
Canadian soccer players
Canadian expatriate soccer players
Canadian expatriate sportspeople in the United States
Edmonton Drillers (1996–2000) players
Expatriate soccer players in the United States
National Professional Soccer League (1984–2001) players
Vancouver Whitecaps (1986–2010) players
Association football midfielders
Association football forwards